Prince Klaas, also known as King Court, Tackey, or by his African name, Kwaku, was an Antiguan slave, who was a posthumous recipient of the Most Exalted Order of the National Hero.

In order to establish an independent African-ruled Kingdom of Antigua and destroy the colonial white administration, Klaas launched a slave uprising that was put down.

Early life 
Klaas, then known as Kwaku, was taken captive from the Ashante in the Gold Coast, which is now modern-day Ghana, when he was 10 years old. He was taken prisoner during the Eguafo Civil War, which broke out as a result of the death of King Takyi Kuma. This gave British and Danish slave dealers the opportunity to seize as many people as they could and sell them as slaves. Kwaku lived in St. John's and was the "chief slave," "owned" by slave owner Thomas Kerby, a Judge of the Peace and Speaker of the Assembly.

Coronation and the plot to create the Kingdom of Antigua

Coronation 
Klass was installed as King of the Black Antiguans during an Akan ritual at one of the planning sessions. Although this was regarded by the white Antiguan slave owners as a "innocent ceremony," according to Western African traditions, it was actually a declaration of war.

Kingdom of Antigua rebellion plan 
In the original 1728 design for the Kingdom of Antigua, all Europeans were to be put to death. The plan's preparation took eight years, and was ready to be carried out in 1736.

A 10-gallon barrel of gunpowder would be smuggled into the venue and blown up during a large ball honoring King George II in late October 1736 with the intention of killing every European there. The explosion's noise would serve as a warning signal for the allied slave Africans to attack every white person they saw, sparking a carnage that would make Prince Klaas the new ruler of Antigua.

Under the proposal, 10 significant plantations were included. If successful, Antigua would have been the first nation in the Western Hemisphere to be governed by the African race.

Foiling of the plot and execution 
On the report of an unnamed slave, Klaas was found guilty of participating in the scheme along with 132 other individuals. The remaining 88 persons who were executed were either gibbeted (6 of them), burned at the stake, or broken on the wheel, including Klaas (77 of them).

He was 45 when he was executed.

Legacy 
Both a statue of Prince Klaas and an exhibition in the nearby National Museum of Antigua and Barbuda are currently present in St. John's.

The Most Exalted Order of the National Hero, Antigua and Barbuda's highest honor, was posthumously given to Klaas in 2000.

References 

1736 deaths
Antigua and Barbuda slaves
Ashanti people